The North American Pacific Fjordland, also known as the Great Bear Fjordland, is a marine ecoregion off the western coast of North America, 
part of the Temperate Northern Pacific marine realm. It borders the Gulf of Alaska to the north, the Salish Sea to the southeast, and the Oregon, Washington, Vancouver coast and shelf to the south.

The fjordland is connected through oceanographic processes utilizing nutrients and productivity from the North Pacific, and the waterways are critical habitat for substantial Northern Pacific cetacean populations, including fin whales, orca, and humpback whales. Major features include the Inside Passage, a coastal route for ships and boats weaving through a network of passages among the many fjordland islands.

See also
List of marine ecoregions in Canada (WWF)
List of marine ecoregions in the United States (WWF)

References

External links

Marine ecoregions
Temperate Northern Pacific